White Knoll is an unincorporated area and census-designated place (CDP) in Lexington County, South Carolina, United States. It was first listed as a CDP prior to the 2020 census with a population of 7,858.

South Carolina Highway 6 passes through the community, leading north to Lexington and southeast  to Swansea.

White Knoll High School is in the northern part of the community on the south side of Platt Springs Road.

Demographics

2020 census

Note: the US Census treats Hispanic/Latino as an ethnic category. This table excludes Latinos from the racial categories and assigns them to a separate category. Hispanics/Latinos can be of any race.

References 

Census-designated places in Lexington County, South Carolina
Census-designated places in South Carolina